Preeti Tomar (born in 1970) is an Indian politician from Delhi belonging to Aam Aadmi Party. She is a member of the Delhi Legislative Assembly. Her husband Jitender Singh Tomar is a former member of the Delhi Legislative Assembly.

Biography
Tomar completed postgraduate studies from Raghunath Girls'  Post Graduate College in 1989. She received B.Ed degree from Meerut University in 1994.

Tomar was elected as a member of the  Delhi Legislative Assembly from Tri Nagar on 11 February 2020.

Electoral performance

References 

Living people
Delhi MLAs 2020–2025
Aam Aadmi Party MLAs from Delhi
Chaudhary Charan Singh University alumni
Women members of the Delhi Legislative Assembly
1970 births
21st-century Indian women politicians